Timothy Alfred Coffey (20 February 1928 – 8 November 1999) was an Irish soccer player.

He played for Drumcondra at club level and was a great favourite with the Drumcondra fans in the 1940s and 1950s. A wing-half, he won a League of Ireland winners medal in 1948/49 and a FAI Cup winners medal in 1954.

On 9 October 1949, he won his only senior cap for the Republic of Ireland national football team when he lined out in defence in a 1–1 draw with Finland in a World Cup qualification tie played in Helsinki. Coffey laid on the opening goal for Irish skipper Peter Farrell. He also represented the League of Ireland.

Honours
 League of Ireland: 1
 Drumcondra 1948/49
 FAI Cup: 1
 Drumcondra 1954

References

Sources
 The Complete Who's Who of Irish International Football, 1945-96 (1996):Stephen McGarrigle

1928 births
1999 deaths
Association footballers from County Dublin
Republic of Ireland association footballers
Ireland (FAI) international footballers
League of Ireland players
Drumcondra F.C. players
Association football defenders